John Dehner (DAY-ner) (born John Dehner Forkum, also credited Dehner Forkum; November 23, 1915February 4, 1992) was an American stage, radio, film, and television actor. From the late 1930s to the late 1980s, he amassed a long list of performance credits, often in roles as sophisticated con men, shady authority figures, and other smooth-talking villains. His credits just in feature films, televised series, and in made-for-TV movies number almost 300 productions. Dehner worked extensively as a radio actor during the latter half of that medium's "golden age,” accumulating hundreds of additional credits on nationally broadcast series. His most notable starring role  was as Paladin on the radio version of the television Western Have Gun – Will Travel, which aired for 106 episodes on CBS from 1958 to 1960. He continued to work as a voice actor in film, such as narrating the film The Hallelujah Trail. Earlier in his career, Dehner also worked briefly for Walt Disney Studios, serving as an assistant animator from 1940 to March 1941 at the company's facilities in Burbank, California.

Early life
Born in 1915 in New York City on Staten Island, John Dehner was the middle child of three children of Ella Susana (née Dehner) and Ralph LeRoy Forkum. John's father was an accomplished artist who was widely recognized in the United States as a landscape painter, illustrator, and a specialist in painting "highly realistic" backgrounds for stage productions and later for animated features and shorts. John's mother was a gifted musician with artistic talents as well. Prior to the 1920s, Ella Forkum even collaborated with her husband on art projects and in some instances was co-credited for helping him to compose content for his drawings and paintings widely used in newspaper and magazine advertising. One example is a full-page advertisement in the March 18, 1917, issue of the Washington, D.C. newspaper Evening Star. That ad is for Djer-Kiss, a very exclusive line of French perfumes and soaps. It depicts a highly stylized, fairytale-like scene of young women bathing beneath a waterfall. The artwork itself bears the attribution to both of John's parents, to "R.L. + E.D. Forkum".

By the early 1920s, R. L. or "Roy" Forkum's growing artistic reputation earned him a commission that allowed him to take young John and the rest of his family to live in Oslo, Norway while he produced illustrations for an elaborate publication celebrating the music of Norwegian composer Edvard Grieg. It was in Oslo where John gained his first experiences performing publicly in musicales and school plays. Following the completion of his work on the Grieg project, Roy took Ella and the children for extended stays in Stockholm, Copenhagen, London, and finally in Paris, where for two and a half years in the French capital's suburb of Asnières-sur-Seine, John and his two sisters, Amy and Alice, continued their education in public schools.

Schooling in France
John's studies in France expanded his interests in art, music, and theater, as well as in the sport of fencing, in which he demonstrated sufficient skills by his early teens to qualify as a "champion" competitor. In her interview with Dehner in 1959, Marcia Minnette, a reporter for the New York trade magazine TV-Radio Mirror, quotes the actor's recollections of attending French schools three decades earlier, in particular his reactions to the rigorous study and strict discipline demanded by his teachers:
Living and studying in Europe "at a formative age" certainly expanded Dehner's knowledge of different cultures and languages. In addition to becoming fluent in Norwegian and French, he also spoke "some" Swedish, Spanish, German, and Italian. That broad knowledge of languages would prove to be very helpful later during his acting career, when Dehner's characters were required to speak with accents or to sprinkle their English dialogue with various foreign words and phrases.

Return to the United States from Europe
While in France, John's parents separated in Paris and on November 15, 1929, were granted a divorce there. Ella Forkum soon returned to the United States with 14-year-old John and his sisters and resettled in the Riverview Manor section of Hastings-on-Hudson, a village located approximately 20 miles north of midtown Manhattan, where John's father resided separately. Between 1930 and 1932, "Dehner Forkum", his mother, and sisters were cited periodically in society columns in the New York Herald Tribune, which reported their attendance and personal performances at charity events, dances, music recitals, and plays presented in Hastings. In February 1932, as part of their high school's bicentennial celebration of George Washington's birthday, Dehner and his older sister Amy performed in Conway Cabal, a historical play written by one of their classmates. The siblings then acted the next month in an adaptation of the 1900 novel Monsieur Beaucaire, a production that won Hastings High School first prize in a regional competition for student plays.

After graduating from Hastings High School in June 1932, Dehner enrolled in the Grand Central School of Art in Manhattan, evidently with intentions to pursue a career in art like his father, who soon relocated to California to continue painting and to work in set design and later drawing backgrounds and storyboards for animation projects being made by Walter Lantz, Walt Disney, and other producers. Despite Dehner's early work in amateur stage productions and his natural talents and training as a painter and sculptor, he did not immediately embrace acting or studio art as a long-term profession.

University studies, 1935–1937
By the fall of 1934, Dehner and his sisters left New York with their mother and relocated to the West Coast, where Amy enrolled at the University of California, Berkeley. The next year John enrolled as well at Berkeley to continue his formal studies in fine arts. While at the university, he also gained more practical experience acting in campus stage productions and refining his musical talents by playing piano and composing arrangements for three local dance bands. Later school and military records indicate that he decided to leave Berkeley in the summer of 1937 after completing two years of study.

Professional stage training
Dehner left Berkeley at the end of his second year to return to New York City to try acting in professional stage productions. There he joined a troupe associated with the Moscow Art Theatre (MAT), where he obtained intensive training in the "system" of method acting established by Soviet theatre practitioner Konstantin Stanislavski. Years later, long after Dehner had established himself as a popular actor in films and on radio and television, he credited MAT for profoundly influencing his performance style, although it was a style that over time required him to adjust substantially his acting techniques in order to achieve widespread success with American audiences. In particular, he recognized Mikhail Chekov, a former student of Stanislavski and the leading consultant to the New York troupe, as being professionally "'the most important man in my career.'" The Los Angeles Times in a 1971 interview with Dehner recounted how his approach to acting evolved with his MAT training:

One of the notable stage productions in which Dehner was cast in New York is The Bridal Crown (1901) by Swedish playwright August Strindberg. Premiering on Broadway at the Vanderbilt Theatre on February 5, 1938, the play was presented under the auspices of the Experimental Theatre of Manhattan. Brooks Atkinson, then a critic for The New York Times, reviewed the stage work by "The New York Players", whom he characterized as "serious-minded" and composed of "young people with a passion for the theatre and in most cases slim pocketbooks". While citing "Dehner Forkum" among the principal actors and serving in the role of "Mats", Atkinson deemed the troupe's overall effort to be only "a respectable student performance".

Dehner continued to perform, although sporadically, in other plays in New York and with a few nearby stock companies. He did receive some financial support from his mother, but the lack of consistent, paid acting work required Dehner to find employment elsewhere in the city to support himself, including taking daytime jobs as a sales clerk in a tobacco shop and parking cars at the 1939 New York World's Fair. Frustrated by his meager lifestyle and the limited prospects of establishing a livable stage career in the city, he decided by the end of 1939 to return, as he described it, to the "life-line" of California.

Return to California
Upon his return to California, Dehner did not resettle in Berkeley to resume his university studies or to find an off-campus job there. His mother, who by then was living on Arch Street in Berkeley and managing a "variety store", chose to remain in the city while John relocated to Southern California, to Los Angeles County, where in Hollywood there were greater opportunities for trained actors and artists to find employment in the film industry. An added advantage to moving there was that John's father was already working regularly for different studios. One was Walt Disney Studios, where Roy Forkum served as a "story artist" at new facilities being constructed by Disney in Burbank, just a short distance from Hollywood. Dehner moved in with his father and new stepmother, Eileen, who were living in a house that Roy owned in Burbank at 454 South Fairview Street.

Walt Disney Studios
The 1940 federal census also documents that both father and son were employed that year at "motion picture studios"; Roy Forkum, as an "artist"; and 24-year-old John, as a "new worker & student" (apprentice). Other period records, however, provide some details about John's work at that time, more specifically that he, like his father, was working at Disney, where as an animator he assisted in producing drawings for Disney's 1940 animated classic Fantasia as well as for The Reluctant Dragon (1941) and for the early development of Bambi (1942).

Dehner worked for a year at Disney, and in the previously cited 1959 interview with TV-Radio Mirror he describes his job there as an "'in-betweener'", as an assistant artist "'who draws everything that goes 'in between' bits of action as sketched by the animators.'" "'Sometimes'", he states in that interview, "'I spent days merely drawing curly lines to simulate waves, or leaf outlines, or horizons.'" A Disney film distributed by RKO Pictures in 1941 actually shows Dehner working at the studio. Titled The Reluctant Dragon, the first part of the film follows American actor and humorist Robert Benchley taking a behind-the-scenes tour of various production departments at Disney's facilities in Burbank. Benchley in one segment visits a storyboard room for Disney animators who are portrayed composing and drawing a future cartoon short featuring the character "Baby Weems". A very young Dehner is briefly shown among fellow staff greeting Benchley, and later doing a sketch of Baby Weems while making a remark in his subsequently familiar voice.  Struggling actor Alan Ladd portrays one of the storyboard artists, with the most screen time, excitedly explaining the storyboards. Later that same year, Ladd would be cast in This Gun for Hire (1941) at Paramount, paving the way for his becoming one of the screen's top box office draws.

Military service
After registering with the military draft in Los Angeles County in October 1940, John left Disney's animation department in early March 1941 to volunteer for the United States Army, a full nine months before Japan attacked Pearl Harbor and officially drew the United States into World War II. In his enlistment papers, he identifies his civilian occupation as an artist and art teacher specializing in sculpture. John's initial army training prepared him to serve as a gunnery instructor, although he was soon selected for officer candidate school. Additional physical exams during routine screening for his candidacy revealed that Dehner had a stomach ulcer, one so severe that it prompted army physicians by the end of 1941 to honorably discharge him from military service on medical grounds.

Radio
After Dehner was medically discharged from the army, he did not resume his job at Disney; instead, he embarked on a radio career, working initially as an announcer. Broadcasting and Broadcast Advertising, a widely read radio publication based in Washington, D.C., reported in March 1942 that "John Dehner Forkum...has joined the KFAC, Los Angeles, announcing staff, replacing Jack Little". By September that year, Dehner was working in Beverly Hills at KMPC, where he was promoted from serving as a "relief announcer" to a full-time position at the station. It was at that time too when he began to identify himself professionally and consistently as "John Dehner", dropping his surname. KMPC soon promoted the "announcer-writer" and occasional disc jockey yet again, elevating him to news editor. Dehner then moved to radio station KFWB, also broadcasting from Los Angeles, where he was part of a news team that won a Peabody Award for its reporting on the first United Nations conference held in San Francisco in 1945.

Dehner in the early 1940s also began performing as an actor on radio, and he continued to do so throughout the 1950s and into the 1960s. Among his earliest radio-based acting jobs was while he was employed at station KMPC, where from late 1942 to 1944 he voiced the title character and narrated the syndicated horror anthology The Hermit's Cave, which was produced by William Conrad. For the rest of the 1940s and for the remaining years of the "Golden Age of Radio", into the early 1960s, Dehner served as a guest star, a recurring character, or lead on some of the greatest nationally broadcast series of that period, all while working as well in films and on television. A few of those major radio productions are Escape, Yours Truly, Johnny Dollar, Let George Do It, California Caravan, The Count of Monte Cristo; Crime Classics; Lassie, NBC University Theater, The Adventures of Philip Marlowe, Rogers of the Gazette, Suspense, The Man Called X, The Silent Men, Smilin' Ed's Buster Brown Gang, Voyage of the Scarlet Queen, The Whistler, Family Skeleton, The Black Book, and The Adventures of Sam Spade.
Dehner was also one of three actors to perform as Scotland Yard inspector Peter Black on the radio crime drama Pursuit, which aired on CBS Radio between 1949 and 1952. Between 1950 and 1951, he co-starred as Elmer in the radio comedy The Truitts. In 1952, he played the title character on  The Judge, a single episode audition (equivalent to a television pilot), but it never went to series.

Articulate and possessing a rich baritone voice, Dehner during the 1950s was recognized by Radio Life Magazine for having the entertainment industry's "best radio voice", an asset that continued to provide him many more opportunities in broadcasting. Much of his work in that period was performing as an array of characters in radio Westerns such as The Cisco Kid, Wild Bill Hickok, Gunsmoke, and Fort Laramie. He also starred in two Western series on CBS Radio in 1958. In February that year, he began voicing the title character for Frontier Gentleman, a weekly series that followed the "action-filled" exploits of J. B. Kendall, a British Army veteran who as a newspaper reporter traveled throughout the Old West gathering stories for The London Times. Although that series lasted only nine months, Dehner's representation of Kendall in 42 episodes was well received by period reviewers, one of whom described the actor's portrayal of the main character as "elegant and icily effective". Only a week after the final broadcast of Frontier Gentleman in November 1958, Dehner premiered as the gunfighter-private detective Paladin on the radio version of Have Gun Will Travel. That series, which totaled 106 episodes, continued for two full years, ending in November 1960.

Films
Dehner during his 50-year entertainment career performed in over 125 feature films and shorts. He made his first "big screen" appearances in the early 1940s after he was discharged from the army, performing in uncredited bit parts while still working predominantly in radio. For several years he worked picture-to-picture as a modern journeyman, visiting casting offices, auditioning, and building screen time and experience at Republic, RKO, Warner Bros., Paramount, Metro-Goldwyn-Mayer, and Twentieth Century-Fox. Among Dehner's initial film appearances are his uncredited role in a Republic Western in which he broke his right hand in a fight scene and as "Sheik Ameer" in the 1943 Sol Lesser production Tarzan's Desert Mystery.

Other roles in which he was cast include a military officer, radio announcer, miner, medical intern, and state trooper in films such as Thirty Seconds Over Tokyo (1944), Lake Placid Serenade (1944), The Corn Is Green (1945), Twice Blessed (1945), Captain Eddie (1945), Christmas in Connecticut  (1945), State Fair (1945), She Went to the Races (1945), and Club Havana (1945). Although Dehner's early performances in these motion pictures were not actually credited on screen, his name began to appear in cast credits published in leading film-industry publications. For instance, his name and roles in both Captain Eddie and State Fair are cited in the nation's top movie-fan magazine in 1945, Photoplay, as well as in The Film Daily and the Showmen's Trade Review.

For the rest of the 1940s, Dehner continued to perform in assorted film genres: crime dramas, mysteries, seafaring and jungle adventures, espionage stories, and a growing number of Westerns. Steadily during his early years of film acting, Dehner established a reputation among casting directors and theater audience as a reliable performer who could portray a myriad of characters, although most often in villainous roles as crooked gamblers, evil bankers, distinguished foreign spies, grifters, edgy gunfighters, and other "heavies". In fact, a news item titled "John Dehner Turns to Right of Law" and published in Ohio in the July 21, 1950, issue of the Toledo Union Journal underscores how entrenched that reputation was. The newspaper describes for movie fans the actor's role in an upcoming picture:

1950s–1965

The 1950s were Dehner's busiest years performing in theatrical films. He was cast in at least 63 features released during that decade and fully half of those pictures are Westerns, several of which offered Dehner the most substantial parts of his screen career. After getting good notices for his supporting role in the 1956 RKO production Tension at Table Rock, Dehner was chosen by Howard W. Koch and Aubrey Schenck of Bel-Air Productions to be the lead in Revolt at Fort Laramie (1957), playing cavalry officer Major Seth Bradner. The actor, though a very familiar face to motion picture audiences, was still not considered by most producers to have significant drawing power at the box office. The film-industry publication Motion Picture Exhibitor, which had a large readership of theater owners in 1957, commends the overall quality of Revolt at Fort Laramie in its March 20 review but alludes to the film's lack of star power. The journal describes the 73-minute Western as a "Good programmer" with "competent” performances by Dehner and other cast and a "sufficient" number of action scenes that "holds interest despite lack of name values." The next year, in 1958, Dehner received second billing in The Left Handed Gun, playing opposite Paul Newman who stars as the title character, the outlaw Billy the Kid. Dehner in that film portrays Sheriff Pat Garrett, who tracks down and kills Billy.

Moving into the 1960s, Dehner began that decade co-starring in The Canadians (1961), yet another Western, although it was not a United States production. It was instead an Anglo-Canadian project filmed entirely in Canada by a predominantly English and Canadian cast and crew. Dehner, once again playing the villain as an "Indian-hating rancher", shared top billing with fellow American actor Robert Ryan and British actor Torin Thatcher. For Dehner's next three motion pictures, however, he accepted three supporting roles outside the realm of Westerns and set in contemporary times: the drama The Chapman Report (1962); another contemporary drama, Youngblood Hawke (1962); and a comedy starring Bob Hope and Lucille Ball, Critic's Choice (1963).

In 1964, Dehner co-starred with Wally Cox in Invitation to Ohio, a film sponsored by the Ohio Bell Telephone Company. Cox portrays Doc Hutton, the owner of a small popcorn and peanut wagon, who is seeking to relocate his tiny business to a more profitable area. After reading an advertisement in The Wall Street Journal about the economic advantages of working in Ohio, Hutton calls the state's Director of Development, a role played by Dehner. Comedy ensues when the Director, mistaking the popcorn-peanut vendor as the president of a large industrial corporation, invites Hutton to tour the state with him.

Final theatrical films, 1966–1985
By 1966, Dehner's success in films had been almost exclusively in supporting roles, so in an effort to obtain more leading parts, he decided to establish that year his own production company. Motion Picture Exhibitor reports in its July 6, 1966, issue that Dehner had recently formed  "J. D. Productions", an enterprise with "one of its primary functions" being to purchase story ideas and scripts to develop into projects in which Dehner "would star in the film versions". To what extent Dehner's company developed projects or directed him to parts in future screen productions is unknown, but Dehner continued to act in films for the next 20 years, although not in roles for which he received top billing. His first feature after the establishment of J. D. Productions is the crime drama Stiletto (1969) starring Alex Cord, Britt Ekland, and Patrick O'Neal. Dehner once again plays in a supporting role but on the "right side" of the law, portraying a district attorney.

After appearing in three consecutive Westerns in 1970 and 1971, including Support Your Local Gunfighter with James Garner, Dehner completed his film career performing almost exclusively in productions outside the genre of "cowboy pictures". He was cast in historic dramas like The Lincoln Conspiracy (1977) and the astronaut epic The Right Stuff (1983), in science-fiction features such as Slaughterhouse-Five (1972) and The Boys From Brazil (1978); in comedies like Fun with Dick and Jane (1977) with Jane Fonda and Airplane II: The Sequel (1982); and in neo-noir thrillers such as The Killer Inside Me (1976) and Jagged Edge (1985). Dehner was third-billed under Denver Pyle and Ken Berry (Pyle played the titular character Galen Clark) in the 1976 production Guardian of the Wilderness, in which Dehner appears as the early American naturalist and "Father of the National Park" John Muir.

Television
As Dehner's radio and film careers continued to progress in the 1950s, he also began working increasingly in the rapidly expanding medium of television, and over more than 35 years he performed on a wide range of Western series, situation comedies, science-fiction anthologies, crime dramas, made-for-TV movies, and in guest appearances on variety shows. Among his early performances on televised series are in two 1952 episodes"The Parachute Story" and "The Dead General Story"on NBC's Dangerous Assignment starring Brian Donlevy. While Dehner in those cited episodes and in many other series was identified foremost as a dramatic actor, he was cast too on assorted sitcoms throughout his career. Some of the televised series on which he performed in the 1950s and 1960s are The Soldiers, The Real McCoys, The Andy Griffith Show, The Beverly Hillbillies, F Troop, The Flying Nun,  Get Smart, and Hogan's Heroes.

Dehner is featured as well on the classic science-fiction series The Twilight Zone, appearing in three episodes between 1959 and 1964: as Captain Allenby, a spaceship pilot, in "The Lonely"; as Alan Richards in "The Jungle", a story about a construction-company owner who is terrorized by African spiritual forces; and as a con man, who in "Mr. Garrity and the Graves" arrives in the small 1890 town of "Happiness", Arizona claiming he can raise the dead. Dehner's performance in the latter episode showcases one example of his talent for projecting subtle humor. Marc Scott Zicree in the 1989 edition of his book The Twilight Zone Companion highlights that quality in Dehner's portrayal of Garrity, describing the actor as "marvelously dry as a con man".

Western series
For most of Dehner's television career, the genre he performed most often in was the Western, especially during the 1950s and 1960s. He was cast, at times repeatedly, as a guest star or major supporting character in over 40 Western series. These include The Adventures of Kit Carson, Cheyenne with Clint Walker, Zorro, numerous extremely varied roles in Maverick (including the frequently mentioned episode "Shady Deal at Sunny Acres" with both James Garner and Jack Kelly), Dick Powell's Zane Grey Theatre, Tales of Wells Fargo with Dale Robertson, Bat Masterson, Rawhide, Bonanza, Law of the Plainsman, The Rebel with Nick Adams, Cimarron City, The Alaskans with Roger Moore, The Restless Gun, The Rifleman, Stagecoach West, The Texan, Black Saddle, Wagon Train, Wanted: Dead or Alive, Wichita Town, Stoney Burke, A Man Called Shenandoah, Branded with Chuck Connors, The Virginian, The Wild Wild West, The Big Valley with Barbara Stanwyck, and The High Chaparral with Cameron Mitchell.

In the September 1960 issue of the TV-Radio Mirror, staff reporter Sam Campbell commented about Dehner's frequent appearances on television in a feature article and highlights the actor's ongoing reputation as one of the American television industry's top villains in weekly Westerns. Campbell also observes that being a frequently working supporting actor like Dehner has distinct advantages over the higher pressures and role requirements of stardom:
Barely a television day goes by without some lawman (quite possibly Pat McVey, a favorite sheriff) firing lead into such worthy villains as John Dehner, Jack Elam, [and] Anthony Caruso. Their faces are most familiar, but their names are almost lost in the credits. As a matter of fact, if their names became too well known, it might be injurious to their careers. The more they can bite the dust without becoming stars, the bigger their swimming pools grow...to the top character actor who is well-established on TV, type-casting is nothing less than a gravy train. You'll hear few complaints from the players we've pictured [in this article], many of whom have been big stars in other fields. Dehner is Paladin in radio's version of Have Gun, Will Travel. 
Dehner in the 1950s and 1960s was cast too in numerous roles on both the radio and television versions of the long-running Western Gunsmoke. His performances as different characters in 12 televised episodes of that series demonstrate the range of his acting talents. He portrays an unlikable drifter in the televised series' second episode, "Hot Spell" (1955); an old gold miner named Nip Cullers, who is desperate to find a wife in "Tap Day for Kitty" (1956); the long-lost, devious father of Dodge City bar owner Kitty Russell in "Daddy-O" (1957); a psychotic gunman in the episode "Crack Up" (1957); a pathetic town drunk—yet a desperately protective father—in "Bottleman" (1958); a sadistic bandit in "The Badge" (1960); a lonely widower who in "The Squaw" (1961) marries a much-younger Arapaho woman and must cope with the resulting hostility of his only son; as a nomadic and lazy would-be farmer traveling with two scheming older children in "Root Down" (1962); a brain-damaged freight operator who undergoes a drastic personality change in "Ash" (1963); a dejected and childless homesteader who finds his peace in taking a bullet that saves Marshall Dillon’s life in "Caleb" (1964); a timid resident of Dodge City who gains fleeting celebrity after killing an outlaw in "The Pariah" (1965); and as Sam Wall, a ruthlessly exploitive businessman in "Dead Man's Law" (1968).

Later televised performances, 19701988
By 1970, the number of Western series on American television had substantially declined, a development that offered Dehner opportunities during the final years of his career to play once again more parts outside that genre. Those opportunities, however, coincided with his expressed dissatisfaction with the state of acting in the entertainment industry. In a one-on-one interview with Dehner, which was published in The Atlanta Constitution and other newspapers in October 1971, syndicated Hollywood columnist Dick Kleiner quoted the actor's views about his profession at that time:

Despite Dehner's changing attitudes regarding the state of his profession, he continued to perform regularly on television series and in made-for-TV movies until just a few years before his death. He played the part of veteran magazine editor Cy Bennett for two seasons (1971–1973) on the weekly sitcom The Doris Day Show and was cast in multiple episodes as a recurring character on other weekly series such as in the second season of the black comedy The New Temperatures Rising Show (1973), as Barrett Fears in Big Hawaii (1977), in the soap operas Bare Essence (1983) and The Colbys (1986–1987), and a return to a Western role as the "humorless, businesslike" Marshal Edge Troy in the series Young Maverick (1979–1980). Some of his other roles in that closing period of his career are in docudramas, miniseries, and in movies produced specifically for television. Dehner portrays, for example, former U.S. Secretary of State Dean Acheson in the 1974 ABC presentation The Missiles of October; and for his final role on television, which originally aired on November 23, 1988, he appears as Admiral Ernest King in part seven of the 12-part World War II dramatic miniseries War and Remembrance.

Returns to stage
Dehner's decades of overlapping commitments to perform on radio, films, and television left him relatively little time during his career to participate regularly in stage productions as well. He did not, though, leave behind entirely theater work. Over the years, particularly during the 1960s, Dehner enjoyed returning to the stage to direct and to act in roles ranging from leads to minor parts in a variety of plays, usually productions offered at small venues by local theater groups located near Dehner's home in California. In its "On Stage" section in August 1961, the Los Angeles Times announced a presentation at the Santa Monica Women's Club of George Bernard Shaw's play Major Barbara, starring Jocelyn Brando and supported by John Dehner, Lee Marvin, Marvin Miller, Robert Middleton, and other experienced performers. The next year, in September, Dehner directed fellow prominent actors in performances of John Mortimer's comedy I Spy at the "Rustic Canyon Playground clubhouse". Two months later, in November 1962 at the El Capitan Theatre in Hollywood, Dehner joined Lee Marvin again, along with James Whitmore, Louis Nye, and Paul Fix, to play pirates in a production of Peter Pan with Peggy Webber in the title role.

Personal life and death
Dehner married twice, the first time in 1941 to Roma Leonore Meyers, a California native who was five years older than John. The couple had two daughters, Kirsten and Sheila, and remained together for nearly 30 years, until divorcing in October 1970. Three years later, in Los Angeles, Dehner wed Evelyn (née Severance) Elliott, also a native of California. They remained together until his death.

In 1992, a little over three years after performing in the televised miniseries War and Remembrance, Dehner died at age 76 in Santa Barbara, California due to complications from emphysema and diabetes. His body was cremated and the ashes interred at the city cemetery in Carpinteria, a small seaside community situated a short distance east of Santa Barbara.

Filmography

1940s
Fantasia (1940, animator)
The Reluctant Dragon (1941) playing himself as Tall Baby Weems Storyboard Artist with Mustache (uncredited)
Bambi (1942, animator)
Bellboy Donald (1942) as Hotel Manager (voice, uncredited)
Tarzan's Desert Mystery (1943) as Prince Ameer (uncredited)
Thirty Seconds Over Tokyo (1944) as Lieutenant Commander (uncredited)
Hollywood Canteen (1944) as Norwegian Sailor (uncredited)
Lake Placid Serenade (1944) as Radio Announcer (uncredited)
The Corn Is Green (1945) as Miner with Pipe in Bar (uncredited)
Twice Blessed (1945) as Contest Announcer (uncredited)
Captain Eddie (1945) as Ambulance Attendant (uncredited)
Christmas in Connecticut (1945) as State Trooper #2 (uncredited)
State Fair (1945) as Hog Contest Announcer (uncredited)
She Went to the Races (1945) as Winner's Announcer (uncredited)
Club Havana (1945) as Jeffreys (uncredited)
The Undercover Woman (1946) as Walter Hughes
The Catman of Paris (1946) as Georges
Her Kind of Man (1946) as Guest (uncredited)
Rendezvous 24 (1946) as Harris (uncredited)
O.S.S. (1946) as German Radar Captain (uncredited)
The Searching Wind (1946) as American Reporter in Paris (uncredited)
The Last Crooked Mile (1946) as Jarvis – Gang Leader
Big Town (1946) as Willard Erskine (uncredited)
Out California Way (1946) as Rod Mason
It's a Joke, Son! (1947) as Reporter (uncredited)
Vigilantes of Boomtown (1947) as Bob Fitzsimmons
Golden Earrings (1947) as SS Officer with Hoff (uncredited)
Blonde Savage (1947) as Joe Comstock
Bury Me Dead (1947) as Reporter (uncredited)
Dream Girl (1948) as Radio Announcer (uncredited)
He Walked by Night (1948) as Assistant Bureau Chief (uncredited)
Let's Live a Little (1948) as Dempster (uncredited)
State Department: File 649 (1949) as Third Oral Examiner (uncredited)
I Cheated the Law (1949) as Newspaperman (uncredited)
Tulsa (1949) as Oilman (uncredited)
Riders of the Pony Express (1949) as John Dakin
 Kazan (1949) as Henri Le Clerc
The Secret of St. Ives (1949) as Couguelat
Barbary Pirate (1949) as Murad Reis
Prejudice (1949) as Office Bigot (uncredited)
Bandits of El Dorado (1949) as Charles Bruton
Feudin' Rhythm (1949) as Serious Actor (uncredited)
Mary Ryan, Detective (1949) as Belden (uncredited)
Horsemen of the Sierras (1949) as Duke Webster
Bodyhold (1949) as Sir Raphael Brokenridge

1950s
Backfire (1950) as Blake – Plainclothes Cop (uncredited)
Dynamite Pass (1950) as Anson Thurber
Captive Girl (1950) as Hakim
Texas Dynamo (1950) as Stanton
Destination Murder (1950) as Frank Niles
Rogues of Sherwood Forest (1950) as Sir Baldric (uncredited)
David Harding, Counterspy (1950) as Frank Reynolds (uncredited)
Three Secrets (1950) as Gordon Crossley (uncredited)
Last of the Buccaneers (1950) as Sgt. Belchue
Counterspy Meets Scotland Yard (1950) as Agent Bob Reynolds
The Flying Missile (1950) as Lieutenant Commander (uncredited)
Fort Savage Raiders (1951) as Capt. Michael Craydon
When the Redskins Rode (1951) as John Delmont
Lorna Doone (1951) as Baron de Wichehalse
The Texas Rangers (1951) as John Wesley 'Wes' Hardin
China Corsair (1951) as Pedro
Corky of Gasoline Alley (1951) as Jefferson Jay – Confidence Man (uncredited)
Hot Lead (1951) as Turk Thorne aka John H. Smith
Ten Tall Men (1951) as Jardine
Harem Girl (1952) as Khalil
The Green Glove (1952) as Narrator (uncredited)
Aladdin and His Lamp (1952) as Prince Bokra
Scaramouche (1952) as Doutreval
Desert Passage (1952) as Bronson
California Conquest (1952) as Fredo Brios
Cripple Creek (1952) as Emil Cabeau
Lady in the Iron Mask (1952) as Count de Fourrier
Junction City (1952) as Emmett Sanderson
Plymouth Adventure (1952) as Gilbert Winslow
Man on a Tightrope (1953) as The Chief
Powder River (1953) as Harvey Logan
Fort Algiers (1953) as Major Colle
Gun Belt (1953) as Matt Ringo
Vicki (1953) as Police Capt. J. 'Chief' Donald (uncredited)
The Steel Lady (1953) as Sid Barlowe
Southwest Passage (1954) as Matt Carroll
The Bowery Boys Meet the Monsters (1954) as Dr. Derek Gravesend
Apache (1954) as Weddle
The Prodigal (1955) as Joram
The Man from Bitter Ridge (1955) as Ranse Jackman
Tall Man Riding (1955) as Ames Luddington
The Scarlet Coat (1955) as Nathanael Greene
The King's Thief (1955) as Capt Herrick
Duel on the Mississippi (1955) as Jules Tulane
Top Gun (1955) as Tom Quentin
Carousel (1956) as Mr. Bascombe
Please Murder Me (1956) as Ray Willis
Terror at Midnight (1956) as Lew Hanlon
A Day of Fury (1956) as Preacher Jason
The Fastest Gun Alive (1956) as Taylor Swope
Tension at Table Rock (1956) as Hampton
Gunsmoke (1957 episode "Daddy-O") as Wayne Russell, Kitty’s father.
Revolt at Fort Laramie (1957) as Maj. Seth Bradner
The Iron Sheriff (1957) as Roger Pollack
Trooper Hook (1957) as Fred Sutliff
The Girl in Black Stockings (1957) as Sheriff Jess Holmes
The Restless Gun (1958) as Mr. Temple in Episode "The Coward"
The Restless Gun (1958) as Sheriff Partridge in Episode "Quiet City"
The Left Handed Gun (1958) as Pat Garrett
Apache Territory (1958) as Grant Kimbrough
Man of the West (1958) as Claude
Timbuktu (1958) as Emir Bhaki aka The Lion of the Desert
Wanted Dead or Alive (1959) as Sheriff Hayes
Cast a Long Shadow (1959) as Chip Donohue  
Wagon Train (1959) as Cleve Colter
The Restless Gun (1959) in final series episode "The Hill of Death"
Bat Masterson (1959) as a vengeful Sheriff
The Twilight Zone "The Lonely" episode (1959) as Captain Allenby

1960s
Vice Raid (1960) as Narrator (uncredited)
The Tom Ewell Show (1961) as Newton Pickering
Maverick (1961) as Luther Cannonbaugh
The Canadians (1961) as Frank Boone
Gunsmoke (1961 episode "The Squaw") as Hardy Tate
The Twilight Zone (1961 episode "The Jungle") as Alan Richards
The Chapman Report (1962) as Geoffrey Harnish
The Virginian (1963 episode "To Make This Place Remember") as Frank Sturgis
The Virginian (1963 episode "Echo of Another Day") as Bleeck
Critic's Choice (1963) as S.P. Champlain
The Andy Griffith Show (1963 episode "Aunt Bee's Medicine Man") as Colonel Harvey
The Twilight Zone (1964 episode "Mr. Garrity and the Graves") as Jared Garrity
Youngblood Hawke (1964) as Scotty Hawke
Combat! (1964) as Gen. Armand Bouchard
The Baileys of Balboa (1964–1965) as Commodore Cecil Wyntoon 
The Wild Wild West (1965) as John Maxwell Avery in "Night of the Casual Killer" and (1966) as Colonel "Iron Man" Torres in "The Night of the Steel Assassin"
The Hallelujah Trail (1965) as Narrator (uncredited)
Hogan's Heroes (1966 two part episode “A Tiger Hunt in Paris”) as Colonel Backscheider
The Helicopter Spies (1968) as Dr. Parviz Kharmusi
The Beverly Hillbillies (1968) as Dr. Rex Goodbody
Stiletto (1969) as District Attorney Frank Simpson
The High Chaparral (1969) as Gar Burnett

1970s
Quarantined (1970) as Dr. John Bedford
Tiger by the Tail (1970) as Sheriff Chancey Jones
The Cheyenne Social Club (1970) as Clay Carroll (uncredited)
Dirty Dingus Magee (1970) as Brig. Gen. George
Support Your Local Gunfighter (1971) as Colonel Ames
Slaughterhouse-Five (1972) as Prof. Rumfoord
The Day of the Dolphin (1973) as Ben Wallingford – Foundation
The Missiles of October (1974) as Former Secretary of State Dean Acheson
Kolchak: The Night Stalker (1975) as Capt. Vernon Rausch
The Killer Inside Me (1976) as Bob Maples
Guardian of the Wilderness (1976) as John Muir
Fun with Dick and Jane (1977) as Jane's Father
The Lincoln Conspiracy (1977) as Col. Lafayette C. Baker
The Boys from Brazil (1978) as Henry Wheelock

1980s
Nothing Personal (1980) as Senator
Airplane II: The Sequel (1982) as The Commissioner
The Winds of War (1983) as Admiral Ernest King
The Right Stuff (1983) as Henry Luce
Jagged Edge (1985) as Judge Carrigan
Creator (1985) as Paul
War and Remembrance (part VII of miniseries, 1988) as Admiral Ernest King

Notes

References

External links

1915 births
1992 deaths
20th-century American male actors
20th-century American pianists
American male film actors
American male pianists
American male radio actors
American male television actors
Animators from New York (state)
Artists from New York City
Deaths from diabetes
Deaths from emphysema
Disney people
Male Western (genre) film actors
Male actors from New York City
People from Los Angeles
People from Staten Island
Western (genre) television actors
20th-century American male musicians